Reckoning is an Australian crime thriller television limited series developed for Sony Pictures Television Networks' AXN. It received a direct-to-series order of 10 episodes on May 2, 2018. Production started in early July 2018.

Premise
When a teenager goes missing and a serial killer is suspected after five years of being dormant, two fathers find themselves set on a course of mutual destruction that threatens to consume every part of their quiet, suburban community.

Cast

Main 
 Sam Trammell as Leo Doyle
 Aden Young as Detective Sergeant Mike Serrato
 Simone Kessell as Paige Serrato
 Laura Gordon as Candace Doyle
 Gloria Garayua as Detective Cyd Ramos
 Jacqueline McKenzie as Linda Swain
 Mitzi Ruhlmann as Amanda Serrato
 Toby Schmitz as John Ainsworth

Recurring 
 Milly Alcock as Sam Serrato
 Ed Oxenbould as Paxton Doyle
 Finn Little as Jake Serrato
 Anthony Phelan as Dr. Arlon Doyle
 Diana Glenn as Tori McGrath
 Robert Mammone as Chief Randy Sosa 
 Paula Arundell as Sheriff Woller 
 Di Smith as Dotty Doyle 
 Sean Barker as Edgar Harris 
 Nic English as Brad 
 Claude Scott-Mitchell as Gretchen McGrath
 Kasia Stelmach as Iris Swan
 Eduardo Santos as Officer Clifton

Reception
Film critic John Serba, questioned the originality of the show saying "It just doesn't offer enough original fodder to lure us into a 10-episode binge." Serba concludes his review describing how "the premise is too contrived and the characters too familiar to render it more than just another rote serial killer story."

Production
While the series' story takes place in Northern California, shooting and post-production were done in Sydney, New South Wales, Australia through incentives offered by the Made in NSW International Footloose Fund. The drama was produced by Playmaker Media, an Australian leader in premium scripted content. Sony Pictures Television Distribution handled worldwide sales of the series, with international release via the AXN pay channel.

The series was released on the Netflix streaming service on May 1, 2020.

References

External links 
 

English-language television shows
Television series by Sony Pictures Television
Television series by Playmaker Media
2019 Australian television series debuts
2019 Australian television series endings